Laeviscutella dekimpei, the roundbelly pellonuline, is a small fish belonging to the herring family, Clupeidae, which inhabits rivers and brackish lagoons in Africa.  It is the only member of its genus.

References

Clupeidae
Fish of Africa
Taxa named by Max Poll
Fish described in 1965
Monotypic fish genera
Monotypic freshwater fish genera
Monotypic ray-finned fish genera